Peter Harold Dimmock, CVO, CBE (6 December 1920 – 20 November 2015) was a British sports broadcaster and senior television executive during the formative years of the medium in the 1950s. He was the first host of the BBC's long-running Grandstand and of the BBC Sports Personality of the Year awards.

Early life and career
Born in London, Dimmock attended Dulwich College and a finishing establishment in France. At the outbreak of war he joined the Royal Army Service Corps, a territorial unit. He was called up only two months later to serve in France during the retreat from Dunkirk. In March 1941 he was allowed to transfer into the Royal Air Force and qualified as a Pilot Officer. Then in 1943 he became a flying instructor on Tiger Moth and Miles Magister trainers with the rank of Flight Lieutenant. In February 1944 he was appointed as a staff officer at the Air Ministry. After demobilisation he joined the Press Association and later the BBC in March 1946, around the time the television service was revived, working in outside broadcasts - a department of which he became head in the 1950s.

Television career
He was involved in the television coverage of the 1948 London Olympics. The following year he was the commentator on the University Boat Race. As head of outside broadcasts, Dimmock was in charge of events such as the Queen's Coronation in 1953 and the first televised Grand National in 1960. He continued to be Head of Outside Broadcasts until leaving the BBC in 1972.

Dimmock launched a televisual coverage from April 1954 in front of the cameras as the host of a new sport news programme Sportsview (which became Sportsnight in 1968), with what would be a long-running Speedway series. In its first year the series featured Roger Bannister's record breaking four-minute mile run. The BBC Sports Personality of the Year award also started in 1954 – with Dimmock again taking the presenter role, which he was to continue for over a decade. Having presented Sportsview for over four years, he fronted the first two shows of Grandstand in October 1958 before handing over to David Coleman. He presented his final Sportsview in 1964 and took up several other roles within the BBC until he left in 1977.

Personal life
Dimmock married BBC continuity announcer and What's My Line? panellist Polly Elwes. Elwes died on 15 July 1987 from bone cancer. They had three daughters, Amanda, Christina and Freya. On 8 June 1990 he married Christabel Rosamund Bagge. He died on 20 November 2015 at the age of 94.

Awards
Officer of the Order of the British Empire (OBE) (1961)
Commander of the Victorian Order (CVO) (1968)
 Freeman of the City of London (1977)
 Elected a Freeman of the Royal Television Society (1978)
 Royal Television Society RTS Sports Awards – Special Judges Award 2004

References

External links
Dimmock's profile on the BBC web site

1920 births
2015 deaths
People educated at Dulwich College
British sports broadcasters
BBC sports presenters and reporters
Officers of the Order of the British Empire
Commanders of the Royal Victorian Order
Royal Air Force pilots of World War II
British Army personnel of World War II
Royal Army Service Corps soldiers
Royal Air Force officers